Charlie Wilson Jr. (November 19, 1929 – April 15, 1983) was an American Negro league outfielder in the 1940s.

A native of Sanford, Florida, Wilson made his Negro leagues debut in 1948 with the Indianapolis Clowns, and played with Indianapolis again in 1949. He went on to play minor league baseball in the Mandak League with the Brandon Grays into the 1950s. Wilson died in Sanford in 1983 at age 53.

References

External links
 and Seamheads

1929 births
1983 deaths
Indianapolis Clowns players
20th-century African-American sportspeople
Baseball outfielders